UCL Undergraduate Preparatory Certificate (UPC) is a foundation course for international students taught at University College London (UCL). It is an intensive one-year course to prepare international students for a variety of degree programmes at UCL and other leading UK universities.

The course is targeted at international students of high academic ability whose own country's education system does not allow direct admission to undergraduate degree programmes at UCL and other top UK universities.

The course is both intensive and challenging, combining the study of academic subjects with Academic English (or a Modern European Language, for native English speakers). All lectures, seminars, tutorials and  laboratory sessions (for Science and Engineering students) are delivered by UCL staff within the university.

UPC students are registered as UCL students and have access to all the academic, welfare, social and cultural resources of the university. UPC students are supported with their UCAS application and the aim is to ensure that on completing the course students are confident enough to meet the challenges of university study in the UK.

UPC Pathways

UPCSE
The Undergraduate Preparatory Certificate for Science and Engineering (UPCSE) is a full-time foundation course in science and engineering for international students who are aiming to gain access to science-based undergraduate degree programmes. Students are prepared for the following undergraduate degrees: Architecture, Astrophysics, Biological Sciences, Biomedical Sciences, Engineering Sciences, Earth Sciences, Economics, Information Management for Business, Life Sciences, Mathematical and Physical sciences, Statistical Science, Medicine and Urban Planning amongst others.

Students take two compulsory subjects: Academic English and Science & Society, alongside two core science modules chosen from Chemistry, Biology, Physics, Mathematics and Architecture (optional for those taking the UCL Architecture BSc Pathway).

UPCH
The Undergraduate Preparatory Certificate for the Humanities (UPCH) is a foundation course for the humanities and social sciences designed for international students who are aiming to gain access to humanities/social science-based undergraduate degree programmes. Students will be prepared for the following subjects at undergraduate degree level including Anthropology, Archaeology, Architecture, Economics, European Social and Political Studies, History of Art, History, Information Management for Business, Geography, Law, Modern Languages and Culture, Philosophy and Psychology.

Students take two compulsory subjects: Academic English and Culture & Society, alongside two core modules from Classical World, Economics, Geography, Mathematics, Modern European Art & Literature and Modern European History & Politics.

UPCHmel
The Undergraduate Preparatory Certificate for the Humanities (with a modern European Language) is a UPCH variant for students from native English Speaking countries who hold a High School Diploma of grade 3.0 and above (or equivalent). Students are offered the same subjects as those from the UPCH except that Academic English is replaced by a modern European Language (either French, German, Italian or Spanish).

Entry into UCL UPC
Entrance into the UCL UPC programme is competitive. Applicants are expected to complete the appropriate High School Certificate or Diploma in their own country and have obtained, or are expecting to obtain, very good grades. Generally, this is the equivalent of US High School Graduation Diploma (GPA) of 3.0 (and above) out of 4.0.  A guide to the minimum national high school qualifications is given in the reference section of this entry.

Applications are accompanied by an essay similar to the UCAS Personal Statement required for undergraduate entry into UK universities. From here, shortlisted applications will be contacted to sit for an entrance exam. Depending on the core modules to be taken, applicants could sit for these entrance exams: Chemistry, Biology, Physics, Mathematics and/or Critical Thinking.

UPC Grades relative to A Levels
UCL offers the following equivalence between UCL grades and A levels:

UCL also offer the following suggestions for UPC equivalents to typical offers in terms of A level grades:

Scholarships
There are no entrance scholarships available from UCL for UPC study. However, there are two UPC Progression Scholarships. One scholarship will be offered each year to 2 UPC students (1 UPCSE student and 1 UPCH student) considered by UPC academic staff to have had the best academic performance.

Students awarded the scholarships must plan to progress to a UCL undergraduate degree programme after stating UCL as a ‘firmly accepted’ choice on their UCAS form. The award will be worth £5,000 towards each year of the student's UCL undergraduate tuition fees.

An academic standard equivalent to at least an upper second class honours (2:1) must be maintained by the student in order to qualify for the award each year of the undergraduate degree programme.

Progression
UCL UPC graduates have progressed onto universities such as UCL, Oxford, Cambridge, LSE, Imperial College, SOAS, Edinburgh, Glasgow, Warwick, KCL, Bristol, Nottingham, Manchester, City, York and many others.  In 2010 60% of UPC students started UCL degree programmes and a further 12% enrolled on other leading university programmes. 40% of former UPC students graduating in 2008 and 2009 from UCL received a first-class bachelor's degree.

References

University College London